Pimkinsky is a rural locality (a khutor) in Samolshinskoye Rural Settlement, Alexeyevsky District, Volgograd Oblast, Russia. The population was 138 as of 2010.

Geography 
Pimkinsky is located 18 km northwest of Alexeyevskaya (the district's administrative centre) by road. Samolshinsky is the nearest rural locality.

References 

Rural localities in Alexeyevsky District, Volgograd Oblast